Benane is a town in Kenya's Garissa County.

References 

Populated places in Isiolo County